Josephine Olivia Connolly MP is a businesswoman and an elected member of the Turks and Caicos Islands House of Assembly. In February 2021 she won her all island seat for the third time and was appointed as a Minister in the new PNP Government.

Early life
Connolly was born in Turks & Caicos on the island of Salt Cay in 1959. She is the daughter of Alexander "Shorty" Smith, the elected representative of Salt Cay and one of the founders of the PNO which later became the PNP.

Career
In 1998, Connolly was a partner in the real estate consulting firm Connolly-Zahm Properties.

In 2010, Connolly was awarded a master's degree from the University of Central Lancashire. In 2010, Connolly was the reigning "Mrs. Turks and Caicos", representing her country in the Mrs. World Pageant.

In July 2012, Connolly became an at-large candidate in the upcoming general election. On 9 November, she was voted in as one of the five at-large members of the parliament. At the first sitting of the house on 28 November, Connolly was unanimously voted in as Deputy Speaker.

In 2013, the Attorney General began an investigation, alleging that Connolly had failed to declare contracts with the Turks and Caicos Islands Government on her declaration of candidacy.

The investigation against Connolly and her political colleagues was subsequently dropped. In the December 2016 election, Connolly retained her seat as an all island member and became part of the new PDM government as Minister of Education, Youth, Sports and Library Services.

In January 2019 Connolly crossed the floor of the House of the Assembly and joined the PNP.

In the February 2021 general election she was voted in as an all Island candidate with PNP, who won a resounding 14–1 victory. Connolly was subsequently appointed as Minister of Tourism, Agriculture, Fisheries, Heritage & the Environment in the new government.

References 

1959 births
Living people
People's Democratic Movement (Turks and Caicos Islands) politicians
Members of the Turks and Caicos Islands House of Assembly
Government ministers of the Turks and Caicos Islands
21st-century British women politicians